The 2014 Yukon/NWT Men's Curling Championship, the men's curling championship for Yukon and the Northwest Territories, was held from February 6 to 9 at the Whitehorse Curling Club in Whitehorse, Yukon. The winning Jamie Koe rink from Yellowknife, Northwest Territories represented Yukon and the Northwest Territories at the 2014 Tim Hortons Brier in Kamloops.

Teams

Round robin standings
Final Round Robin Standings

Round robin results

Draw 1
Thursday, February 6, 6:30 pm

Draw 2
Friday, February 7, 10:00 am

Draw 3
Friday, February 7, 3:00 pm

Draw 4
Saturday, February 8, 10:00 am

Draw 5
Saturday, February 8, 3:00 pm

Draw 6
Sunday, February 9, 9:00 am

External links

2014 Tim Hortons Brier
Curling in Yukon
Sport in Whitehorse
2014 in Yukon
Curling in the Northwest Territories